An orthotube is a capsule-like high security interlocking door allowing entry to a building or office by one authorised person at a time. Orthotubes are typically used by security and intelligence agencies, such as the Australian Security Intelligence Organisation and the United Kingdom Security Service to control access to buildings housing sensitive information. The devices appear in the BBC spy drama Spooks, in which they are referred to as pods.

Orthotubes are manufactured by Boon Edam B.V. of the Netherlands and marketed as Circlelock.

References

External links
Boon Edam - Circlelock, the high security interlocking door 

Security technology